The 1896–97 season was the second competitive season in Belgian football.

Overview
Only one official league existed at the time.  It was called Coupe de Championnat (Championship Cup) and was disputed between 6 teams since only one new team was admitted whereas the last two of the previous championship were withdrawn.

Honour

League standings

External links
RSSSF archive - Final tables 1895-2002
Belgian clubs history

 
Seasons in Belgian football
1896–97 in European football by country